Little Pine Lagoon is a rural locality in the local government area (LGA) of Central Highlands in the Central LGA region of Tasmania. The 2016 census recorded a population of nil for the state suburb of Little Pine Lagoon.

History 
Little Pine Lagoon is a confirmed locality and a body of water (the lagoon).

Geography
The River Ouse forms much of the eastern boundary. The Little Pine River forms part of the western boundary before flowing east to the lagoon, which is retained by the Little Pine Dam.

Road infrastructure 
Route B11 (Marlborough Road) runs through from north-east to south.

References

Towns in Tasmania
Localities of Central Highlands Council